Vladimir Livşiţ  (born 24 March 1984) is a Moldovan-Israeli footballer currently under contract with Ahva Reineh.

References

External links

Profile at moldova.sports.md

1984 births
Living people
Moldovan footballers
Israeli footballers
CS Tiligul-Tiras Tiraspol players
FC Costuleni players
FC Rapid Ghidighici players
CS Pandurii Târgu Jiu players
CSF Bălți players
FC Tiraspol players
Shimshon Kafr Qasim F.C. players
F.C. Haifa Robi Shapira players
Hapoel Bu'eine F.C. players
Moldovan emigrants to Israel
Moldovan expatriate footballers
Expatriate footballers in Romania
Moldovan expatriate sportspeople in Romania
Liga I players
Moldovan Super Liga players
Association football goalkeepers